Harvey Township is a township in Cowley County, Kansas, USA.  As of the 2000 census, its population was 117.

Geography
According to the USGS, it contains three cemeteries: Glen Grouse, Mount Vernon and Timber Creek.

The streams of Ferguson Creek, Gardners Branch, Goose Creek, Riley Creek and Wagoner Creek run through this township.

References
 USGS Geographic Names Information System (GNIS)

External links
 City-Data.com

Townships in Cowley County, Kansas
Townships in Kansas